Eurythmia angulella is a species of snout moth in the genus Eurhodope. It was described by Charles Russell Ely in 1910 and is known from North America.

References

Moths described in 1910
Phycitinae